ARPL may refer to:

ARPL (opcode), an x86 instruction introduced with Intel 80286
ARPL (programming language), a calculator programming language by Hewlett-Packard
ARPL (finance), Average Revenue Per Line